David Hespe, twice, was Commissioner of the New Jersey Department of Education. He was appointed by Governor Chris Christie.  He was appointed Acting Commissioner in February 2014 was confirmed by the Senate in December 2014. He resigned in September 2016.

He is Of Counsel at Porzio, Bromberg & Newman, P.C.

Education
Rutgers University School of Law, Newark, NJ, J.D., 1985
Rutgers College, Newark, NJ, B.A., 1982

References

Rutgers School of Law–Newark alumni
New Jersey lawyers
Living people
Year of birth missing (living people)
State cabinet secretaries of New Jersey